Laurence Jack (born 13 January 1968 in Port Vila) is a Vanuatuan sprinter

Jack competed at the 1996 Summer Olympics held in Atlanta, he entered the 200 metres and ran a time of 21.94 seconds and finished 6th in his heat so didn't qualify for the next round. A year later he competed at the 1997 World Championships in Athletics held in Athens, he entered the 100 metres, in the first round he finished 91st out of 103 runners so didn't qualify for the next round.

References

External links
 

1968 births
Living people
Vanuatuan male sprinters
Athletes (track and field) at the 1998 Commonwealth Games
Commonwealth Games competitors for Vanuatu
Athletes (track and field) at the 1996 Summer Olympics
Olympic athletes of Vanuatu
World Athletics Championships athletes for Vanuatu
People from Port Vila